Seswaa (as the dish is called in the north of Botswana) or loswao (as the dish is called in the south of the country and western South Africa) is a traditional meat dish of Botswana, made of beef or goat meat.  It is prepared using leftover cuts or tough cuts such as legs, neck and back. The dish is normally prepared for ceremonies such as funerals, weddings and national events such as independence celebrations. The meat is boiled until tender in a pot, with "just enough salt", and pounded. It is often served with pap (maize meal), setampa (samp, ground corn) or mabele (sorghum).

See also

 List of African dishes

References

Botswana cuisine
Meat dishes
National dishes